The 1970 Cork Junior Hurling Championship was the 73rd staging of the Cork Junior Hurling Championship since its establishment by the Cork County Board.

The final was played on 29 November 1970 at the Ballinhassig Grounds, between Cloughduv and Courcey Rovers, in what was their first ever meeting in the final. Cloughduv won the match by 3-15 to 2-04 to claim their second championship title overall and a first title in 30 years.

Cloughduv's Connie Kelly was the championship's top scorer with 3-13.

Qualification

Results

Quarter-finals

Semi-finals

Final

Championship statistics

Top scorers

Overall

In a single game

References

Cork Junior Hurling Championship
Cork Junior Hurling Championship